Tuareg in Burkina Faso are Burkina Faso citizens of Tuareg descent or persons of Tuareg descent residing in Burkina Faso. Ethnic Tuareg in Burkina Faso are believed to number around 1,500,000.

See also 
Tuareg

References 

Ethnic groups in Burkina Faso